United Nations Security Council Resolution 442, adopted unanimously on December 6, 1978, after examining the application of the Commonwealth of Dominica for membership in the United Nations, the Council recommended to the General Assembly that Dominica be admitted.

See also
 List of United Nations member states
 List of United Nations Security Council Resolutions 401 to 500 (1976–1982)

References
Text of the Resolution at undocs.org

External links
 

 0442
 0442
 0442
December 1978 events
1978 in Dominica